The Northern Ireland Childminding Association (NICMA) is a charity and membership organisation, based in Belfast, that represents childminding in Northern Ireland. It promotes quality home-based childcare and learning for the benefit of children, families and communities in Northern Ireland and its services include a childminding information and vacancy helpline.

NICMA's chair is Norma Shearer and its chief executive is Patricia Lewsley-Mooney .

NICMA is currently running a pilot scheme to address the shortage of childcare places in rural areas. This is funded by the Department of Agriculture and Rural Development's Rural Childcare Programme.

See also
Day care
Professional Association for Childcare and Early Years (PACEY) (England and Wales)
Scottish Childminding Association

References

External links

 Scottish Childminding Association
 Professional Association for Childcare and Early Years (PACEY) (England and Wales)

Child care skills organizations
Children's charities based in Northern Ireland